Jewish ceremonial art, also known as Judaica, refers to an array of objects used by Jews for ritual purposes. Because enhancing a mitzvah by performing it with an especially beautiful object is considered a praiseworthy way of honoring God's commandments, Judaism has a long tradition of commissioning ritual objects from craftsmen and artists.

Textual origin 
Judaism has a set of classical early rabbinic commentaries on the Hebrew Bible; these commentary collections are known as the midrash literature. Midrash Mekhilta of Rabbi Ishmael has this teaching on a biblical verse:
 
Other Midrash teachings (e.g. Shir HaShirim Rabbah 1.15) offer the same idea. This idea is expanded upon in the Babylonian Talmud (e.g. Bāḇā Qammā 9b). This teaching was understood by succeeding generations as a duty, when possible, to make beautiful items used in Jewish life and worship, both physical and textual.

Items used on Shabbat 

The following items are used during Shabbat:
Kiddush cup: Kiddush, literally, "sanctification," is a blessing recited over wine or grape juice to sanctify the Shabbat and Jewish holidays. Kiddush cups are highly decorated, and are generally made of china, porcelain, silver, pewter and nickel.
Shabbat candlestick holders
Hand washing cup ("netilat yediam")
Challah cutting board and cover
Havdalah candle and candle holder
Havdalah spice box

The close of the Jewish Shabbat is marked by the brief prayer ceremony of Havdalah, which usually takes place in the home. Part of the ceremony requires sniffing a sweet-smelling spice or plant. In Jewish communities around the Mediterranean, a sprig of a sweet-smelling shrub was customarily used, in Northern Europe by the twelfth century there are literary references of the use of a specially designed spice box or container. The oldest surviving spice boxes for Havdalah date to the mid-sixteenth century. The Jewish Museum (New York) has a German example c. 1550 thought to originate in Frankfurt am Main.

Hanukkah items 

The menorah (or hanukkiah) used on the Jewish holiday of Hanukkah is perhaps the most widely produced article of Jewish ceremonial art. The Lindo lamp is a particularly fine example by an 18th-century silversmith. Contemporary artists often design menorahs, such as the gold-plated brass menorah with 35 moveable branches designed by Yaacov Agam. A silver menorah by Ze'ev Raban from the 1930s is in the Judaica Collection of the North Carolina Museum of Art.
 Chanukah menorah 
 Dreidels 
 Gelt holder
 Chanukah candles or Oil

Sukkot items 

 Etrog Box
To protect the etrog during the Sukkot holiday, it is traditionally wrapped in silky flax fibers and stored in a special box, often made from silver.

In modern times, the etrog is also commonly wrapped in synthetic netting, and placed in cardboard boxes. Wooden boxes are increasingly popular as well.

Books

Passover haggadah 
The tradition of artistically embellished haggadahs, the Jewish text that sets forth the order of the Passover Seder, dates back to the Middle Ages. The Sarajevo Haggadah of 1350 is a celebrated example. Major contemporary artists have produced notable haggadahs, such as the Szyk Hagaddah. See also the facsimile edition of the even earlier Barcelona Haggadah of 1340.

Notable Judaica collections
Museums with notable collections of Jewish ceremonial art include the British Library, the Israel Museum, the Jewish Museum (London), the Musée d'Art et d'Histoire du Judaïsme in Paris, the Jewish Museum in Prague, the North Carolina Museum of Art, the Jewish Museum (New York), the Musée Lorrain in Nancy, the Musée alsacien in Strasbourg and the Contemporary Jewish Museum of San Francisco. The Museum of Jewish Heritage in Battery City Park, New York City also holds a sizable collection. Another way to see Judaica is through the art marketplace, including auction houses. Sotheby's, Bonhams-New York, Skinner's and Kestenbaums routinely hold regular auctions each year.

See also
Judaic Digital Library
Religious art

Other items
Mizrach, object indicating the direction of prayer
Parochet, curtain of the Torah Ark
Shiviti, meditative text

References

External links
 The Bezalel Narkiss Index of Jewish Art
 The Types of Jewish Jewelry (Judaica)
 Jewish Fine Art (Judaica)

 
Jewish ritual objects
Jewish art
Middle Eastern art